Koosha Toofan is a fitness model, competitive natural bodybuilder (lifelong drug-free athlete), sponsored athlete by "LA Muscle", entrepreneur (co-founder of a web start-up company), humanitarian, motivational speaker, as well as a 2006 graduate from the University of California, Davis; where he majored in Electrical Engineering, and has worked in the Electrical power industry.

Koosha competed in May 2009 at the MuscleMania "Model America" Championships in Orange County, CA, where he placed second. For this competition Koosha was coached by his good friend, and world famous fitness model/bodybuilder, Sagi Kalev; later he joined Kalev's team of elite athletes - Team Kalev

References

Living people
Businesspeople in software
University of California, Davis alumni
American bodybuilders
Davis Senior High School (California) alumni
Year of birth missing (living people)